Wallace Tangiiti (born 16 October 1995) is an Australian professional rugby league footballer who has played in the 2010s.

Tangiiti is a Cook Islands international.

References

External links

South Sydney Rabbitohs profile
NRL profile
Leaguenet profile

Living people
1995 births
Australian people of Cook Island descent
Australian rugby league players
North Sydney Bears NSW Cup players
Cook Islands national rugby league team players
Rugby league hookers
Rugby league players from Sydney